Marcelo José Oliveira (born 5 September 1981), commonly known as Marcelo Oliveira, is a former Brazilian football defender.

Club career

Corinthians / Grêmio
Oliveira started his career at Brazil, where he played for Corinthians and Grêmio.

Atromitos
In 2006, he moved to the Greek club Atromitos and he stayed at the club for five seasons, appearing in 117 matches and scoring 8 goals.

APOEL
On 9 June 2011, he signed a two-years contract with the Cypriot club APOEL. In his first season at the club, he won the Cypriot Super Cup and appeared in eight 2011–12 UEFA Champions League matches for APOEL, in the club's surprising run to the quarter-finals of the competition. He became a champion for the first time in his career after winning the 2012–13 Cypriot First Division with APOEL. During the 2013–14 season, he appeared in five 2013–14 UEFA Europa League group stage matches for APOEL and won all the titles in Cyprus, the Cypriot League, the Cypriot Cup and the Cypriot Super Cup.

Moreirense
On 14 July 2014, he signed a one-year contract with the Portuguese side Moreirense.

Honours
 APOEL
Cypriot First Division (2) : 2012–13, 2013–14
Cypriot Cup (1) : 2013–14
Cypriot Super Cup (2) : 2011, 2013

 Moreirense
Taça da Liga (1): 2016–17

References

External links
APOEL official profile
Profile sambafoot 

1981 births
Living people
Brazilian footballers
Brazilian expatriate footballers
Sport Club Corinthians Paulista players
Grêmio Foot-Ball Porto Alegrense players
Atromitos F.C. players
APOEL FC players
Moreirense F.C. players
Super League Greece players
Primeira Liga players
Cypriot First Division players
Expatriate footballers in Greece
Expatriate footballers in Cyprus
Expatriate footballers in Portugal
Brazilian expatriate sportspeople in Cyprus

Association football defenders